Janet Horne (died 1727) was the last person to be executed legally for witchcraft in the British Isles.

Horne and her daughter were arrested in Dornoch in Sutherland and imprisoned on the accusations of her neighbours. Horne was showing signs of senility, and her daughter had a deformity of her hands and feet. The neighbours accused Horne of having used her daughter as a pony to ride to the Devil, where she had her shod by him. The trial was conducted very quickly; the sheriff, Captain David Ross, had judged both guilty and sentenced them to be burned at the stake. The daughter managed to escape, but Janet was stripped, smeared with tar, paraded through the town on a barrel and burned alive. Nine years after her death the witchcraft acts were repealed in Scotland.

Janet (or Jenny) Horne was also a generic name for witches in the north of Scotland at the time and this makes it difficult to determine what the real name of this woman may have been. Contemporary writers may have called her 'Janet Horne' simply because her real name was unknown or because the name was reported as 'Janet Horne' and they were unaware that this was a generic name. Some sources give the date of the Dornoch execution as June 1722.

Legacy

The Witch's Stone in Littletown, Dornoch, marks the alleged spot of Horne's execution.

She is the subject of the play The Last Witch by Rona Munro, which premiered at the 2009 Edinburgh International Festival and was part of the 2018 summer season at Pitlochry Festival Theatre.

References

External links 

People executed for witchcraft
Executed British people
1727 deaths
Executed Scottish women
People executed by the Kingdom of Great Britain
18th-century Scottish people
People from Sutherland
Year of birth unknown
People executed by Scotland by burning
Witch trials in Scotland